Basic Education High School No. 1 Bago is a public high school located in Bago, Myanmar.

High schools in Bago Region